Railway Transportation was a Sydney based monthly trade magazine covering rail transport in Australia.

Overview
Railway Transportation was established in October 1951 by Frank Shennen.

Shennen Publishing already published Truck & Bus Transportation and in 1967 established Freight & Container Transportation. After being rebranded Railway & Urban Transportation in January 1974, it ceased publishing in December 1974.

References

Monthly magazines published in Australia
Magazines established in 1951
Magazines disestablished in 1974
Magazines published in Sydney
Rail transport magazines published in Australia
1951 establishments in Australia
1974 disestablishments in Australia